Ahmad Ghazālī (full name Majd al-Dīn Abū al-Fotuḥ Aḥmad Ghazālī) was a Sunni Muslim Persian Sufi mystic, writer, preacher and the head of Al-Nizamiyya of Baghdad (c. 1061–1123 or 1126). He is best known in the history of Islam for his ideas on love and the meaning of love, expressed primarily in the book Sawāneḥ.

Life
The younger brother of the better known theologian, jurist, and Sufi, Abū Ḥāmid Muḥammad al-Ghazālī, Ahmad Ghazālī was born in a village near Tūs, in  Khorasan. Here he was educated primarily in jurisprudence. He turned to Sufism while still young, becoming the pupil first of Abu Bakr Nassaj Tusi (died 1094) and then of Abu Ali Farmadi (died 1084).  He was advanced in Sufism by 1095, and his brother Abū Ḥāmid  asked him to teach in his place in the Nezamiya of Baghdad and assume responsibility during his planned absence.

Ahmad Ghazālī’s thought, centered as it was on the idea of love, left a profound mark on the development of Persian Islamic mystical literature, especially poetry celebrating love. Many of the topoi (maẓāmīn) used by later poets such as ʿAṭṭār, Saʿdī, ʿIrāqī, and Ḥāfeẓ, to name but a few, can be traced to his works, particularly the Sawāneḥ.

Among his predecessors, he was influenced most strongly by Ḥallāj, and he made of his idea of essential love the basis of his own thought. His belief that all created beauty is an emanation of divine beauty was likewise Hallajian or neo-Platonic in origin. Since God is both absolute beauty and the lover of all phenomenal beauty, Ahmad Ghazālī maintained, to adore any object of beauty is to participate in a divine act of love. Hence the practice of naẓar-bāzī or šāhed-bāzī, gazing on young and beautiful faces, a practice for which he became notorious.

Students of Ahmad al Ghazali

Ahmad Ghazālī travelled extensively in the capacities of both Sufi master and a popular preacher.  He visited Nishapur, Maragheh, Hamadan and Isfahan. He initiated and trained eminent masters of Sufism including Ayn al-Quzat Hamadani , Sheikh Adi ibn Musafir, Abu al-Najib al-Suhrawardi , The latter was the founder of the Suhrawardiyya Order and its derivatives such as the Kubrawiyya, Mevlevi and Ni'matullāhī orders.

He died in Qazvin in 1123 or 1126 and is buried there.

Works
Sawāneḥ, a little book  written around 1114 and comprising some 77 short chapters. It was innovative in form, for at a time when Persian Sufi authors used only prose, Ghazālī had recourse to verse in order to illustrate in metaphorical fashion the themes he expounded more technically in the prose sections of his work.
Risālat al-ṭayr (or al-ṭuyūr) (Epistle of the Birds): In this work Ghazālī employs the metaphor of a bird and its journey to speak of the spiritual path to illumination in God.  This work set a precedent for the Conference of the Birds by Attar of Nishapur.
Al-tajrīd fī kalimat al-tawḥīd, a theological and mystical interpretation of the basic testimony of Islam, Lā ilāha illā Allāh, which reflects his adherence to the Ashʿarite school of theology.
Baḥr al-maḥabba fī asrār al-mawadda, a Sufi commentary on Sūrat Yūsuf (Koran 12); and an abridgment of his brother’s Iḥyāʾ ʿulūm al-dīn, a work he himself taught.
Bawāriq al-ilmāʾ fī l-radd ‘alā man yuḥarrim al-samāʾ, a description and justification of the Sufi Sama ritual and apology for the compatibility of music and Islam.

Notes

Iranian Sufis
11th-century Persian-language writers
12th-century Persian-language writers
11th-century Iranian people
12th-century Iranian people
Poets from the Seljuk Empire
Sunni fiqh scholars
Sunni imams
11th-century Muslim theologians
12th-century Muslim theologians
Iranian Muslim mystics